Darius James (aka Dr. Snakeskin, born 1954) is an African-American author and performance artist. He is the author of That's Blaxploitation: Roots of the Baadasssss 'Tude (Rated X by an All-Whyte Jury), an unorthodox, semi-autobiographical history of the blaxploitation film genre, and Negrophobia: An Urban Parable, a satirical novel written in screenplay form.

His work is influenced by the Voodoo religion. James lives in Hamden, Connecticut.

He appeared in the 2006 film Black Deutschland.  He co-wrote and appeared in a feature-length film released in 2013, The United States of Hoodoo.

Books

 That's Blaxploitation: Roots of the Baadasssss 'Tude (Rated X by an All'Whyte Jury)
 Negrophobia: An Urban Parable
 Voodoo Stew (German/English), Verbrecher Verlag Berlin, 2004
 Froggie Chocolate's Christmas Eve / Froggie Chocolates Weihnachtsabend (German/English), Verbrecher Verlag Berlin, 2005

See also

Closet screenplay

References

External links

Darius James "Super-Thug" History Lesson

1954 births
Living people
African-American novelists
American male novelists
20th-century American novelists
20th-century American male writers
20th-century American non-fiction writers
American male non-fiction writers
20th-century African-American writers
21st-century African-American people
African-American male writers